Imamzadeh Sultan Mutahhar is an historical mausoleum in the city of Rudehen in Tehran province.

Located in the Bumehen neighborhood of Roudehen, the current structure was rebuilt in the 15th century and contains the tomb of the murdered son of Jafar as Sadiq, the 6th Shia Imam.

See also
Iranian architecture
Imamzadeh

Notes

Buildings and structures completed in the 15th century
Architecture in Iran